Fientje Salomina Jarangga is a women's rights activist from Papua, Indonesia, who is the co-ordinator of the Papuan Women's Human Rights Network. She campaigns against domestic violence in Papua and is a supporter of the Papuan independence movement.

Activism 
Jarangga is the co-ordinator of the Papuan Women’s Human Rights Network (PWHRN) in Papua. She also co-ordinates Tiki - the branch of the PWHRN that works with and advocates for survivors of domestic violence. Her style of activism has been described as "persistent" by Dini Djalal from the Centre for Humanitarian Dialogue, since she worked against cultural norms in Papua to document human rights abuses.

In 2011 she co-wrote a report with Galuh Wandita, which explored the history of violence against women in Papua, over the preceding forty years. In 2021 she spoke out about how there had been no reduction in the gender inequality that Papuan women face since 2008. She has also spoken out about how extractive industries increase violence against women, including denying women access to traditional economic resources.

Jarangga supports the Papuan independence movement and supported a 2019 judicial review to test how the West Papuan community might have its independence upheld.

References

External links 

 Indonesia Forum: “Evaluasi dan Proyeksi Otonomi Khusus Papua”

Year of birth missing (living people)
Papuan people
Indonesian women activists
Indonesian women's rights activists
People from Papua (province)
Living people